The Inabanga River is the largest river in Bohol, Philippines.

Its name means "Rented River", from the root word abang which means "rent". Due to drownings and attacks by crocodiles (which used to inhabit the river), this loss of life was considered a rent for the use of the river.

In May 2017, the Inabanga River was used by heavily armed members of Abu Sayyaf for a planned incursion into Bohol.

Course

Its sources, the Wahig and Pamacsalan Rivers, spring in the mountains of Sierra Bullones and flow into an irrigation reservoir behind the Pilar or Malinao Dam. From there the Inabanga River bisects Bohol before draining in the Cebu Strait in the north-western part of the island. The major tributaries are the Dagohoy, Danao, Wahig, and Pamacsalan Rivers. Other minor tributaries are the Mas-ing, Sagnap, and Malitbog Rivers.

The coastal plain is one to two miles wide where the river banks are muddy and fringed in many places by nipa mangroves, which are used by locals for nipa plantation and harvesting. Further upstream the surrounding hills rise steeply.

The river's estuary is a productive habitat for invertebrates, fish, and birds, as well as spawning and nursery grounds for many species of fish, supports seagrass vegetation, shellfish beds, and nesting grounds for a variety of birds. The estuary is under threat from human development pressures such as fish pens, oyster farms, recreational use, and pollution.

Watershed
Land use is almost all farmland, with patches of grasslands, thickets and secondary forests. Forests cover only 14% of the basin. A small portion of it is protected in the Rajah Sikatuna Protected Landscape.

The major subbasins are the Dagohoy River basin (area of ) and Danao River basin (area of ), as well as the Wahig and Pamacsalan basin (area of ).

See also
Other significant rivers in Bohol:
Abatan River
Loboc River

References

Rivers of the Philippines
Landforms of Bohol